Bučovice is a town in Vyškov District in the South Moravian Region of the Czech Republic. It has about 6,500 inhabitants.

Administrative parts
Villages and hamlets of Černčín, Kloboučky, Marefy and Vícemilice are administrative parts of Bučovice.

Geography
It lies on the border between the Litenčice Hills and Ždánice Forest. The Litava River flows through the town.

History
The first written mention of Bučovice is from 1322. However, a stone church stood here already in the 13th century. In the late 14th century, it was referred to as a market town with vineyards.

In the 16th century, Bučovice prospered and developed. The owner of the manor Jan Šembera Černohorský of Boskovice had built here one of the most magnificent Renaissance residences in Moravia. The castle was finished by his son-in-law Maximilian of Liechtenstein in the 1630s. During the Thirty Years' War in 1645, Bučovice was looted and damaged by the Swedish troops, but the castle was defended.

In the second half of the 18th and in the first half of the 19th century, Bučovice was one of the most important centres of cloth production in Moravia. The owners of the textile companies of the time belonged to a large Jewish community. In the second half of the 19th century, Bučovice further developed and gained the character of a town. During the 20th century, the most important economic sector in the town became the woodworking industry.

After the World War II, the castle was confiscated to the Liechtensteins by the state.

Demographics

Sights

Bučovice is known for the Bučovice Castle. The Renaissance castle was built in the style of Italian villas in 1575–1585. Today it is owned by the state and open to the public. The castle has valuable arcade courtyard with 90 columns, which are decorated with a total of 540 reliefs. In the middle of the courtyard is a Mannerist fountain. The interiors have a rich Mannerist decoration.

Notable people
Joseph Fischhof (1804–1857), Czech-Austrian pianist, composer and professor

Twin towns – sister cities

Bučovice is twinned with:
 Zlaté Moravce, Slovakia

References

External links

Bučovice Castle

Cities and towns in the Czech Republic
Populated places in Vyškov District